Lorenzo Gennero (born 30 June 1997) is an Italian snowboarder who competed in the men's halfpipe event at the 2022 Winter Olympics. Gennero had finished twenty fifth in the halfpipe event at the Aspen 2021 World Championships. In 2019 he won the Halfpipe Europa Cup in Crans Montana.

References

External links

1997 births
Living people
Italian male snowboarders
Olympic snowboarders of Italy
Snowboarders at the 2022 Winter Olympics
Sportspeople from Turin
21st-century Italian people